is the seventh single released by the Japanese boyband Kanjani8. The song follows the same disco/funk trend that its predecessor and album featured. There were two versions of this single released, with the limited edition single featuring a special double secret sticker.

This single also is the start of the members' alter-ego for each single's theme. Inside featured lead singer, Subaru Shibutani, in full drag portraying the girl that the song is about.

Track listing

Regular Edition
 " It's My Soul "
 " Ano Kotoba ni "
 " Yorimichi "
 " It's My Soul <Original Karaoke> "

Limited Edition
 " It's My Soul "
 " Ano Kotoba ni "
 " It's My Soul <Original Karaoke> "

Charts

References

2007 singles
Kanjani Eight songs
Oricon Weekly number-one singles
Imperial Records singles
2007 songs